The 1997 Rugby League Premiership Trophy was the 23rd and final end of season Rugby League Premiership competition and the second in the Super League era. Following this season it was merged into the Super League Championship so one true national champion could be determined.

The winners were Wigan Warriors.

Preliminary round

Qualifying Finals

Semi-finals

Final

See Also 

 Super League II

References

Rugby League Premiership